The 2017 Copa del Rey Juvenil is the 67th staging of the Copa del Rey Juvenil de Fútbol. The competition started on May 13, 2017 and finished on June 25, 2017.

First round

The top two teams from each group of the 2016–17 División de Honor Juvenil de Fútbol and the two best third-placed teams were drawn into a two-game best aggregate score series. The first leg was played on May 13 and 14 and the return leg on May 20 and 21.

|}

Quarterfinals

The eight winners from the first round advance to quarterfinals, that are played in a two-game series. The first leg was played on May 27 and 28 and the second leg on June 3 and 4.

|}

Semifinals

The four winners from the quarterfinals advance to semifinals, that are played in a two-game series. The first leg was played on June 10 and 11 and the second leg on June 18.

|}

Final

The semifinal winners play a one-game final at Calahorra in La Rioja on June 25.

See also
2016–17 División de Honor Juvenil de Fútbol

References

Copa del Rey Juvenil de Fútbol
Juvenil